The Parent Trap II is a 1986 American made-for-television comedy film and a sequel to Disney's 1961 film The Parent Trap (which was based on the 1949 book Lisa and Lottie by Erich Kästner) and the second installment in The Parent Trap series. It premiered on the Disney Channel on July 26, 1986 as a part of the channel’s “Premiere Films” banner.

Hayley Mills is the only actress that returned from the original film. She continues to portray Susan and Sharon, the twins who were separated at age one, met up twelve years later at summer camp, switched places and went on to reunite their divorced parents.

The film focuses on Sharon's daughter, Nikki, who tries to hook her mother up with her best friend Mary's father, portrayed by Tom Skerritt. It was a success for the Disney Channel and it later spawned two more made-for-television sequels, both produced in 1989.

Plot 
The film takes place twenty-five years after the original film. Sharon Ferris (née McKendrick) is divorced and living as a single mother in Tampa, Florida. Her daughter, Nikki, is not happy about their impending move to New York City and Sharon's decision to send her to an all-girls school in the fall. While in summer school, Nikki makes enemies with Jessica Dintruff (Tannen) but befriends Mary Grand. Mary's father, Bill Grand, has been widowed for four years. To stop Nikki from moving to New York City and to see their parents happily married, the girls scheme to set them up.

Nikki and Mary trick their parents into meeting each other by sending Sharon flowers that are supposedly from Bill, but they do not just fall madly in love with each other as the girls had hoped, so they contact Sharon's twin sister, Susan Carey (née Evers). She is married and still living in California. She is convinced by the girls to fly to Tampa to help them by posing as Sharon and going on a few dates just to get things started.

Susan, disguised as Sharon, "accidentally" bumps into Bill at a bar called the Press Box and watches a few innings of a baseball game with him.  The real Sharon detests baseball, and is confused when Bill drops by her workplace the next day and mentions how much fun they had. Susan and Bill cross paths a couple more times over the next few days. Florence (Cromwell) Bill and Mary's maid, begins to suspect that something is awry.

Sharon discovers the girls' scheme and decides to trick them instead. She contacts Brian Carey (Harvey) Susan's husband, who is a pilot for Trans World Airlines, and involves him in her scheme. While Susan and Bill are on a date, the real Sharon and Brian pretend to also be on one, with Sharon dressed as a different woman.

Susan becomes distracted and clumsy on her date while watching her husband. Finally having had enough, she announces to Bill that the man she is watching is her husband. She storms over to their table, but begins laughing when she sees her sister underneath a black wig.

Susan and Sharon clear up the situation for Bill, and Sharon says that she does not have romantic feelings for him, and would like it if they just remained friends.

A going away party is thrown for Sharon and Nikki on the boat of her boss, Mr. Elias. Sharon and Bill meet in the cabin while Nikki and Mary go get something from the car. The girls release the ropes from the boat and push it away from the dock. The guests begin arriving and watch helplessly as the boat drifts away.

Sharon and Bill are enjoying each other's company, but wonder where everyone is. They go to the deck, see how far out they are from the shore, and then, Bill kisses Sharon. The scene switches to the wedding. Mary and Nikki are finally step-sisters and Nikki doesn't have to move to New York City.

Cast 
 Hayley Mills as Sharon Ferris / Susan Carey
 Tom Skerritt as Bill Grand
 Carrie Kei Heim as Nicole "Nikki" Ferris
 Bridgette Andersen as Mary Grand
 Alex Harvey as Brian Carey
 Gloria Cromwell as Florence
 Judith Tannen as Jessica Dintroff

Production

Writing 
The idea of a second film was announced in 1985. On her interview with Good Morning America that year, Mills wasn't sure about reprising her role as the twins: "I was astonished. I thought what they wanted to do was try to repeat the original film in some way. I wasn't too sure that was a very good idea. It was a good film, and it has passed the test of time", Mills said to the Chicago Sun-Times.

She also further explained about her involvement in the sequel: "I did hesitate before saying yes, first because it was always my favorite film and I wasn't sure about making a sequel. Second, because it's taken me so long to try to break away from my Disney image. It's been a real impediment toward getting the kind of roles I want. But everyone at Disney was so enthusiastic about the project that I finally agreed to do it. And I think it's turned out well".

The film was written by Stuart Krieger. In the original draft of the script, Sharon was originally going to have a son, instead of a daughter like she does in the film. This was changed when rewrites of the script were ordered. The names of Nikki Ferris and Mary Grand are the same names of the characters that Mills portrayed in the Disney films The Moon-Spinners and In Search of the Castaways. Director Ronald F. Maxwell revealed that this was a homage to Mills' films with The Walt Disney Company.

The characters of Walter and Lillian Elias are named after Walt Disney and his wife (Disney's full name was Walter Elias Disney; Lillian was his wife's name).

Filming 
Ronald F. Maxwell was chosen to direct this sequel, taking over from the original's director David Swift. When the film premiered on the Disney Channel, a documentary titled On Location: Parent Trap II accompanied it. The documentary included footage of Mills as she describes the production of the film and her history with the Disney films. Filming took place for three weeks in the Tampa area. The exteriors of Robert E. Lee Elementary and the interiors of Mitchell Elementary were used as the summer school that Nikki and Mary both attend.

The film was shot in 18 days. Mills said that "I never worked so hard in my life".

A local Publix was used as the grocery store where Susan and Sharon narrowly miss meeting each other. It has been remodeled drastically since filming had wrapped.

Music 
The film's score was composed by Charles Fox. The theme song is "Let's Keep What We've Got", written by Fox and Hal David and performed by Marilyn McCoo. It appears in the opening credits while clips from the original The Parent Trap movie play, and is reprised in the closing credits when the final scene (Nicki and Mary, as junior bridesmaids/flower girls, walk up the aisle after their parents' wedding) is frozen.

Other songs in the film include "Nothin' At All", sung by Andrea Robinson, who would later voice Ariel's mother, Athena, in Disney's The Little Mermaid: Ariel's Beginning, and "Stand Back", sung by Phyllis St. James.

References

External links 

 
 
 

2
1986 television films
American comedy television films
Disney Channel original films
1980s English-language films
Films directed by Ronald F. Maxwell
Films scored by Charles Fox
Films set in Tampa, Florida
Films about twin sisters
Films about weddings
Films about families
Films about widowhood
Television sequel films
Twins in American films
1980s American films